Tiefenbeek (also Breitentalbach) is a small river of Lower Saxony, Germany. It flows into the Sieber in the village Sieber.

See also
List of rivers of Lower Saxony

Rivers of Lower Saxony
Rivers of Germany